Peterborough Combined Police was the territorial police force responsible for law enforcement in Peterborough, England, from 1947 to 1965. It was created from the amalgamation of the Liberty of Peterborough Constabulary and the Peterborough City Police.

History

1856–1947 

Following the passing of the County and Borough Police Act 1856, the Liberty of Peterborough Constabulary was formed the following year on 10 March 1857. Later, in 1874, a Charter of Incorporation was granted to the city of Peterborough, prompting the Council to form a Watch Committee along with the Peterborough City Police.

These two forces were combined on 1 April 1947 to form the Peterborough Combined Police.

1947–1965 

In the hot summer of 1958 the Peterborough combined police became the first police force in the UK to issue white summer tunics along with white helmets for that year. It was not a success however as the public ridiculed the policemen as Ice Cream men which ended the jackets and helmets after only a very few days.

On 31 March 1965, five police forces in the Cambridge area—Peterborough Combined Police, Cambridge City Police, Cambridgeshire Constabulary, Huntingdonshire Constabulary and Isle of Ely Constabulary—were united to form the Mid-Anglia Constabulary, headquartered in Brampton. The name changed on 31 March 1974 to form today's Cambridgeshire Constabulary following alterations to the county boundaries.

Top Row: Insp Charlie Balaam, Detective Sgt John Soams, Sgt Stan Lancaster, Sgt Ron Forth, Sgt John Walker, Sgt John Norman, Sgt Jim Arnold, Sgt 'Chips' Chapman, Sgt Gilbert Dobson.

Bottom Row: Detective Insp Percy Vincent, Insp Roy Wool, Insp Harold Southgate, Insp Eric Hubble, Chief Constable Francis George Markin, Chief Insp Reg Beals, Insp Jack Mills, Insp Steve Maddocks, Detective Sgt Major Briggs, Sgt Peter Unsworth.

See also

 Peterborough City Police
 Liberty of Peterborough Constabulary
 Cambridgeshire Constabulary
 Policing in the United Kingdom
 Cambridgeshire Fire and Rescue Service
 East of England Ambulance Service

References 
Booklet Commemorating 100 years of service of THE PETERBOROUGH POLICE 1857 - 1957. And The OFFICIAL OPENING OF THE NEW POLICE HEADQUARTERS Bridge Street Peterborough. Printed by the 'Peterborough Standard' 10/10a Church Street Peterborough.
Commemorating Booklet PDF

Defunct police forces of England
Local government in Cambridgeshire
1836 establishments in England
Government agencies established in 1836
Organisations based in Peterborough